Bahçeli (literally "(place) with gardens") is a Turkish place name and may refer to:

Settlements 
Bahçeli, Alaca
Bahçeli, Beşiri, a village in Batman Province, Turkey
Bahçeli, Biga
Bahçeli, Dikili, a village in Izmir Province, Turkey
Bahçeli, Ezine
Bahçeli, İspir
Bahçeli, Keban
Bahçeli, Niğde, a town in Niğde Province, Turkey
Bahçeli, Yusufeli, a village in Artvin Province, Turkey
The Turkish name of the village of Kalograia in Cyprus

People 
Devlet Bahçeli (born 1948), a politician and a party chairman in Turkey